The Harriman Institute, the first academic center in the United States devoted to the interdisciplinary study of Russia and the Soviet Union, was founded at Columbia University in 1946, with the support of the Rockefeller Foundation, as the Russian Institute.

History
The goals of the new regional institute, as stated in the proposal to the Rockefeller Foundation, were viewed to be twofold: “First, the direct advancement of knowledge in the Russian field through the coordinated research work of faculty and students; and secondly, the training of these students… as American specialists who will subsequently do work of authority and influence in the Russian field.” Although the Institute’s geographical purview has grown to encompass the post-Soviet states and the post-socialist Eastern European states, the Institute has remained true to its overall objectives of teaching and research.

In 1982, the Russian Institute became the W. Averell Harriman Institute for the Advanced Study of the Soviet Union, in recognition both of Governor Harriman’s generous endowment of the Institute and his lifetime of distinguished service. As Governor Harriman stated in the announcement of the establishment of the Harriman Institute: “My objective is very clear: I want to stimulate and encourage the advanced study of Soviet affairs. To base policy on ignorance and illusion is very dangerous. Policy should be based on knowledge and understanding.”

In 1992, following the collapse of the USSR, the Institute officially expanded its focus to encompass all the states of the former Soviet Union and Eastern Europe and adopted the name of the Harriman Institute. In 1997, the Harriman and East Central European Institutes united to promote comparative scholarly knowledge and public understanding of the complex and changing polities, economies, societies, and cultures of the area between Germany and the Pacific Ocean.

Mission

The Harriman Institute strives to facilitate the effective use of the unique resources it possesses to further the work of the diverse community of scholars in residence, students and the more than 60 faculty members who make up the Harriman Institute faculty. Taken together, the library collections of Columbia and the New York Public Library constitute the single largest concentration of Russian-language materials in the country.

Directors 
Past directors of the Harriman Institute Include:

 Geroid T. Robinson, 1946–51
 Philip E. Mosely, 1951–55
 Henry L. Roberts, 1956–62
 Alexander Dallin, 1962–67
 Marshall D. Shulman, 1967–74, ’76–77, ’81–86
 William E. Harkins, 1974–76, ‘80–81
 Robert L. Belknap, 1977–80
 Robert Legvold, 1986–92
 Richard E. Ericson, 1992–95
 Mark L. von Hagen, 1995–2001
 Catharine Theimer Nepomnyashchy, 2001–2009 (on leave 2006–07)
 Jack L. Snyder (Acting Director), 2006–07
 Timothy M. Frye, 2009-2015 (on leave 2012–13)
 Kimberly J. Marten (Acting Director), 2012–13
 Alexander Cooley, 2015–2021
 Valentina Izmirlieva, 2022–

See also
 Marshall D. Shulman
 John N. Hazard

References

External links
 
 

Columbia University
1946 establishments in New York City
Research institutes in New York (state)
Research institutes established in 1946